Andrés José González (born March 25, 1989) is an Argentine swimmer, who specialized in butterfly events. He represented his nation Argentina at the 2008 Summer Olympics, and eventually captured a bronze medal in the 200 m butterfly at the 2010 South American Games in Medellin, Colombia.

Gonzalez competed for Argentina in the men's 200 m butterfly at the 2008 Summer Olympics in Beijing. Leading up to the Games, he won the race with a sterling 2:00.82 to dip beneath the FINA B-standard (2:01.80) at the Latin Cup in Serravalle, San Marino. Trailing from behind throughout the race in heat two, Gonzalez came up with a spectacular swim at the final turn to hit the wall with a third-place time and a new Argentine record in 2:00.36. Gonzalez failed to advance into the semifinals, as he placed thirty-third overall in the prelims.

References

External links
NBC Olympics Profile

1989 births
Living people
Argentine male swimmers
Olympic swimmers of Argentina
Swimmers at the 2008 Summer Olympics
Argentine male butterfly swimmers
People from San Francisco, Córdoba
South American Games bronze medalists for Argentina
South American Games medalists in swimming
Competitors at the 2010 South American Games
Sportspeople from Córdoba Province, Argentina
21st-century Argentine people